Modulate is Bob Mould's fifth solo album, released in 2002. Although a few tracks on his previous release, The Last Dog and Pony Show, had featured tape loops and samples, Mould shocked his fans with such a dramatic embrace of electronica.

The record includes the song "The Receipt," which City Pages observed "can be taken as a barely veiled attack on Mould's old Hüsker Dü-mate Grant Hart."

Mould dubbed the tour supporting this album The Carnival of Light and Sound. It featured him performing alone on stage, backed by prerecorded tracks as short films were projected on screens behind him.

Critical reception
Rolling Stone declared: "Ultimately, this is a rock record with electronic effects, not a techno record with guitars, and it falls short of being totally satisfying as either."

Track listing 
 "180 Rain" – 3:45
 "Sunset Safety Glass" – 4:21
 "Semper Fi" – 3:58
 "Homecoming Parade" – 2:03
 "Lost Zoloft" – 3:18
 "Without?" – 1:41
 "Slay/Sway" – 4:09
 "The Receipt" – 2:26
 "Quasar" – 4:17
 "Soundonsound" – 4:05
 "Hornery" – 1:04
 "Comeonstrong" – 3:43
 "Trade" – 5:24
 "Author's Lament" – 3:24

Charts

References 

2002 albums
Bob Mould albums
Albums produced by Bob Mould
Granary Music albums